is a Japanese politician of the Liberal Democratic Party, a member of the House of Representatives in the Diet (national legislature).

A native of Miyagi Prefecture, she attended Miyagi Gakuin Women's Junior College and Mitsui Memorial Hospital Nursing School; University of Alabama at Birmingham, and University of Illinois at Chicago for her Doctorate (PhD.) in the United States.

She was elected to the House of Representatives for the first time in September 2005. She currently resides in her home prefecture in Japan, and she is divorced from Bloomberg media professional, J. M. Moran (Chicago Illinois).

See also 
 Koizumi Children

References

External links 
 Official website in Japanese.

1959 births
Living people
Female members of the House of Representatives (Japan)
Japanese nurses
Koizumi Children
Liberal Democratic Party (Japan) politicians
Members of the House of Representatives (Japan)
Politicians from Miyagi Prefecture
University of Illinois Chicago alumni
University of Alabama at Birmingham alumni
Japanese expatriates in the United States
21st-century Japanese women politicians